Vasudev Mahadeva Salgaocar (1916–1984) was an Indian businessman, and the founder and chairman of the V. M. Salgaocar Group of Companies, active mainly in iron ore mining, but also in coal mining and wind energy.

He also founded Salgaocar Football Club in 1956, a professional football club who play in the I-League, are based in Vasco, Goa, and are owned by VIMSON, the Shivanand Salgaocar Group.

Since his death, the company was led by his two sons, Shivanand V. Salgaocar and Dattaraj V. Salgaocar, joint managing directors until its split.

His third son was Anil Salgaocar who died in 2016 at the age of 75.

References

1916 births
1984 deaths
Businesspeople from Goa
People from Vasco da Gama, Goa